Yvon Petra defeated Geoff Brown in the final, 6–2, 6–4, 7–9, 5–7, 6–4 to win the gentlemen's singles tennis title at the 1946 Wimbledon Championships. Bobby Riggs was the reigning champion, but was ineligible to compete after turning professional.

Seeds

  Dinny Pails (quarterfinals)
  Jack Kramer (fourth round)
  Geoff Brown (final)
  Pancho Segura (third round)
  Yvon Petra (champion)
  Dragutin Mitić (fourth round)
  Franjo Punčec (quarterfinals)
  Lennart Bergelin (quarterfinals)

Draw

Finals

Top half

Section 1

Section 2

Section 3

Section 4

Bottom half

Section 5

Section 6

Section 7

Section 8

References

External links

Men's Singles
Wimbledon Championship by year – Men's singles